Protein pelota homolog is a protein that in humans is encoded by the PELO gene.

This gene encodes a protein which contains a conserved nuclear localization signal. The encoded protein may have a role in spermatogenesis, cell cycle control, and in meiotic cell division.  In yeasts, the Dom34-Hbs1 complex (with ABCE1) that it forms is responsible for reactivating ribosomes and for recovering those stuck on mRNAs. It is a paralog of the release factor eRF1.

The Drosophila homolog was first discovered in 1993. Mutants exhibit G2/M arrest in meiosis and large nebenkern form in late spermatocytes. Human, yeast (Dom34), plant, and worm homologs are reported in 1995, followed by one found in archaea.

References

Further reading